Pandey Kapil (24 Sept. 1930 – 2 Nov. 2017) was an Indian writer, author, and employee of the Government of Bihar. He translated the book Two Months in Arrah, written by J. Halls, based on the role of Arrah in the Indian Rebellion of 1857.

Life
Kapil was born on 25 September 1930 in Shitalpur, Saran district of the Indian state of Bihar. He completed his B.A. at Banaras Hindu University and M.A. at Babasaheb Bhimrao Ambedkar Bihar University in 1956.

Works

Bhojpuri 

 Phulsunghi (Novel)
 Kah na Sakli 
 Parinami Udan Par
 Kinch Bechari Ka Kahi
 Bhor Ho Gail

Translations 

 Arrah Me Do Maas (Hindi) Translation of Two Months In Arrah.

References

1930 births
2017 deaths